Jalen Taheen Foster, known professionally as Real Boston Richey, is a rapper from Tallahassee, Florida. He is currently signed to American rapper Future's record label Freebandz, and is noted for his usage of Michigan-style hip-hop production. His mixtape Public Housing peaked at number 60 on the Billboard 200.

Career
Real Boston Richey is an American rapper who began rapping in 2021 after the passing of his cousin and from a suggestion from his close friends. In March 2022, he released his single "Keep Dissing". In August 2022, American rapper Future appeared on his single "Bullseye 2" and gifted Richey a chain after signing him to his Freebandz record label. Also in August 2022, he released a 17-track mixtape titled Public Housing. In October 2022, American rapper Lil Durk appeared on his single "Keep Dissing 2" and its subsequent music video.

Musical style 
Alphonse Pierre, writing for Pitchfork, describes Real Boston Richey's music style in the following manner: "That out of town influence doesn’t drown out the idiosyncrasies of a Sunshine State MC though; Richey’s regional drawl makes every word feel slurred and he has a natural melody even though he's not singing. Lyrically, he has a lot of the same problems as the drill-leaning scene across the way in Jacksonville, where nothing ever seems to stick out."

Discography 
Mixtapes
 Public Housing (2022) – No. 60 US Billboard 200
 Public Housing, Pt. 2 (2023) – No. 38 US Billboard 200

References

External links 
 

African-American male rappers
21st-century American male musicians
Living people
People from Florida
People from Tallahassee, Florida
Rappers from Florida
Year of birth missing (living people)